

Codes

References

N